Amadu Turé (born 3 June 1993) is a Guinea-Bissauan footballer  who plays for Salgueiros as a forward.

Football career
On 23 July 2017, Turé made his professional debut with Sporting Covilhã in a 2017–18 Taça da Liga match against União Madeira.

References

External links

Portuguese League profile 

1993 births
Living people
Bissau-Guinean footballers
Association football midfielders
F.C. Oliveira do Hospital players
A.C. Alcanenense players
GD Bragança players
S.C. Covilhã players
C.D.C. Montalegre players
GS Loures players
Sport Benfica e Castelo Branco players
S.C. Salgueiros players